Michael David Wills, Baron Wills  (born 20 May 1952) is a British politician and life peer who served as Minister of State for Justice from 2007 to 2010. A member of the Labour Party, he was Member of Parliament (MP) for Swindon North from 1997 to 2010.

Early life
Wills was born in 1952 to Stephen Wills and his wife Elizabeth (nee McKeowen). He has a younger sister. He went to the independent Haberdashers' Boys' School in Elstree, Hertfordshire and studied at Clare College, Cambridge, where he graduated with a double first in History (BA). Following that, he joined the diplomatic service, gaining the highest mark in the entrance exam.

He worked for HM Diplomatic Service from 1976 to 1980. He became a researcher for London Weekend Television from 1980 to 1984, being a colleague of Peter Mandelson. From 1984 to 1997, he was a Director of Juniper Productions.

Political career
He was elected as the MP for Swindon North in 1997 and quickly joined the government, working in various capacities. He eventually left the government to campaign against the Common Agricultural Policy. This campaign appears to have subsided. He was re-elected as an MP in 2001 and 2005. He has worked as an advisor and speechwriter to Gordon Brown. It was announced he would be appointed to the Privy Council in October 2008.

On 14 September 2009, Wills announced his intention to stand down at the 2010 general election. In the 2010 Dissolution Honours, he was awarded a life peerage, which was created on 10 July 2010 with the title Baron Wills, of North Swindon, in the County of Wiltshire.

Voting record
How Michael Wills voted on key issues since 2001:

 Voted for introducing a smoking ban.
 Voted for introducing ID cards.
 Voted for introducing foundation hospitals.
 Voted for introducing student top-up fees.
 Voted for Labour's anti-terrorism laws.
 Voted for the Iraq war.
 Voted against investigating the Iraq war.
 Voted for replacing Trident.
 Voted for the hunting ban.
 Voted for equal gay rights.

Personal life
He married Jill Freeman on 19 January 1984 in Westminster. They have three sons and two daughters.

Literary career
Michael Wills published two crime novels under the pen name David McKeowen (using his mother's birth name):
 Grip (2005)  
 Trapped (2007)

References

External links
 Guardian Unlimited Politics – Ask Aristotle: Michael Wills MP
 TheyWorkForYou.com – Michael Wills MP

News items
 Missing data discs in November 2007
 Common Agricultural Policy in November 2004
 Ask Michael Wills – Technology in Schools – May 2000

Video clips
 YouTube

1952 births
Living people
People educated at Haberdashers' Boys' School
Alumni of Clare College, Cambridge
Labour Party (UK) MPs for English constituencies
UK MPs 1997–2001
UK MPs 2001–2005
UK MPs 2005–2010
Labour Party (UK) life peers
Life peers created by Elizabeth II
Members of the Privy Council of the United Kingdom